Haemaphlebiella strigata is a moth of the family Erebidae. It was described by E. Dukinfield Jones in 1914. It is found in French Guiana and Brazil.

References

Phaegopterina
Moths described in 1914